Hygromycin B is an antibiotic produced by the bacterium Streptomyces hygroscopicus. It is an aminoglycoside that kills bacteria, fungi and higher eukaryotic cells by inhibiting protein synthesis.

History 
Hygromycin B was originally developed in the 1950s for use with animals and is still added into swine and chicken feed as an anthelmintic or anti-worming agent (product name: Hygromix). Hygromycin B is produced by Streptomyces hygroscopicus, a bacterium isolated in 1953 from a soil sample. Resistance genes were discovered in the early 1980s.

Mechanism of action 
Hygromycin is active against both prokaryotic and eukaryotic cells. It acts by inhibiting polypeptide synthesis. It stabilizes the tRNA-ribosomal acceptor site, thereby inhibiting translation.

Use in research 

In the laboratory it is used for the selection and maintenance of prokaryotic and eukaryotic cells that contain the hygromycin resistance gene. The resistance gene is a kinase that inactivates hygromycin B through phosphorylation. Since the discovery of hygromycin-resistance genes, hygromycin B has become a standard selection antibiotic in gene transfer experiments in many prokaryotic and eukaryotic cells. Based on impurity monitor method, four different kinds of impurities are discovered in commercial hygromycin B from different suppliers and toxicities of different impurities to the cell lines are described in the following external links.

Use in plant research 

Hygromycin resistance gene is frequently used as a selectable marker in research on plants. In rice Agrobacterium-mediated transformation system, hygromycin is used at about 30–75 mg L−1, with an average of 50 mg L−1. The use of hygromycin at 50 mg L−1 demonstrated highly toxic to non-transformed calli. Thus, it can be efficiently used to select transformants.

References 

Aminoglycoside antibiotics
Eukaryotic selection compounds